This is a list of destinations served by Belle Air as of June 2013. The company ceased operations on 25 November 2013.

Albania
Tirana – Tirana International Airport Nënë Tereza Base

Belgium
Brussels – Brussels Airport

Egypt
Sharm el-Sheikh – Sharm el-Sheikh International Airport [charter]

Spain
Palma de Mallorca – Palma de Mallorca [charter]

Greece
Athens – Athens International Airport
Heraklion – Heraklion International Airport
Rhodes – Rhodes International Airport

Italy
Ancona – Ancona Airport
Bari – Bari Airport
Bergamo – Orio al Serio Airport
Bologna – Bologna Airport
Cuneo – Cuneo Levaldigi Airport
Florence – Peretola Airport
Genoa – Genoa Cristoforo Colombo Airport
Milan – Malpensa Airport
Parma – Parma Airport
Perugia – San Egidio Airport
Pescara – Abruzzo Airport
Pisa – Galileo Galilei Airport
Rimini – Federico Fellini Airport
Rome – Leonardo da Vinci Airport
Trieste – Friuli Venezia Giulia Airport
Venice – Venice Marco Polo Airport
Verona – Verona Airport

Thailand
Bangkok – Suvarnabhumi international airport

Kosovo
Pristina – Pristina International Airport Adem Jashari

Turkey
Antalya – Antalya Airport [charter]

United Kingdom
London – London Stansted Airport

Belle Air Europe
This is a list of destinations served by the Belle Air Europe as of June 2013. Belle Air Europe ceased operations one day after its parent company on 26 November 2013.

Belgium
Brussels – Brussels Airport

France
EuroAirport Basel-Mulhouse-Freiburg

Germany
Düsseldorf – Düsseldorf Airport
Hannover – Hannover Airport
München – Munich Airport
Stuttgart – Stuttgart Airport

Italy
Milan – Malpensa Airport
Rome – Leonardo da Vinci Airport
Venice – Venice Marco Polo Airport
Verona – Verona Airport

Kosovo
Pristina – Pristina International Airport Adem Jashari Hub

Macedonia
Skopje – Skopje Alexander the Great Airport

Switzerland
Geneve – Geneva International Airport
Zurich – Zurich Airport

References

Belle Air
Lists of airline destinations